Flexithrix is a Gram-negative, non-spore-forming and motile genus from the family of Flammeovirgaceae with one known species (Flexithrix dorotheae) which first has been isolated from marine mud. Flammeovirga produce zeaxanthin, poly-β-D-glutamic acid and poly-β-L-glutamine.

References

Further reading 
 
 

Cytophagia
Bacteria genera
Monotypic bacteria genera